Riopa is a genus of skinks. It is easy to tell the species apart from most other skinks by bright red coloring on their sides from which they get their name. They also have a bule that runs down the side of their tail.

Diet
The riopas are omnivore reptiles, they usually eat insects like crickets or worms, but sometimes, they can eat little pieces of meat (usually little mice)

Species

The following species are recognized.

Riopa albopunctata (Gray, 1846) – white-spotted supple skink
Riopa anguina (Theobald, 1868)
Riopa goaensis (Sharma, 1976) – Goan supple skink
Riopa guentheri  (W. Peters, 1879) – Günther's supple skink, Günther's writhing skink
Riopa lineata Gray, 1839 – lined supple skink 
Riopa lineolata (Stoliczka, 1870) –  striped writhing skink
Riopa popae (Shreve, 1940) – Pope's writhing skink
Riopa punctata (Gmelin, 1799) – common dotted garden skink, common snake skink, punctate supple skink 
Riopa vosmaerii (Gray, 1839) – Vosmer's writhing skink

References

Riopa
Lizard genera
Taxa named by John Edward Gray